Tetamauara is a genus of longhorn beetles of the subfamily Lamiinae, containing the following species:

 Tetamauara eximia (Bates, 1885)
 Tetamauara retifera (Waterhouse, 1880)
 Tetamauara unicolor (Bates, 1885)

References

Hemilophini